Grahame Arthur Buckley (1957–2016) was an Australian rugby league footballer who played in the 1970s and 1980s.

Playing career

Buckley was graded at the St. George Dragons from Peakhurst J.R.L.F.C in 1977 and made his first-grade debut for the St George Dragons in Round 10 of the 1978 NSWRFL season. Buckley made 59 first grade appearances in total over, a span of seven seasons, which included being involved in the club's 1979 premiership campaign and was a much loved Dragons player of his era. He was a crowd favourite at Kogarah Jubilee Oval, and is remembered as a man who played above his weight.

He later joined the Illawarra Steelers where he played one game during the 1986 season.

Death

After retiring, he later moved to Wauchope, New South Wales. Grahame Buckley was very well respected in the Wauchope rugby league and surf club community. He unfortunately suffered a fatal heart attack doing surf-boat training on Lake Cathie, New South Wales on 3 March 2016.

Accolades

His surf club, the Wauchope-Bonny Hills Surf Club have named their surf boat rower of the year in his memory.

References

1957 births
2016 deaths
Australian rugby league players
St. George Dragons players
Illawarra Steelers players
Rugby league locks
Rugby league players from Sydney